, nicknamed "Oiyan", is a retired Japanese professional baseball player, former pitching coach and current manager for the Chiba Lotte Marines of Nippon Professional Baseball (NPB). He pitched in Major League Baseball from 1998 to 2002.

Career
Yoshii played in the Koshien high school baseball tournament twice and joined the Kintetsu Buffaloes as the second round pick in the 1983 draft after graduating from the same elementary, middle, and high schools as former Seibu Lions manager, Osamu Higashio. After spending some time in the minors, he marked his first victory in 1987, and in 1988, he won 10 games and saved 24 games, which won him the Pacific League relief pitcher title. He won five games and marked another 20 saves his next year. In 1993, he became a starter. In 1995, he was traded to the Yakult Swallows and won more than 10 games a year for three straight years.

 In the 1997 off-season, he became a free agent and signed with the New York Mets. Yoshii agreed to a two-year extension worth $5 million with the Mets in November 1998. He was traded to the Colorado Rockies in 2000, for Bobby Jones. In September, Yoshii underwent surgery to remove bone spurs from his elbow. Two months later, he agreed to a new contract with the Rockies for the 2001 season. The team tried to trade him before the season started, but eventually released Yoshii, who then signed with the Montreal Expos in March 2001. He had surgery on his left shoulder in September 2002.

In 2003, Yoshii returned to Japan, joining the Orix BlueWave. He was the team's opening-day starter that year but had surgery on his left ankle in August; he ended the season with only two wins. He played in only three games in 2004 and was cut from the team at the end of the year. The Orix BlueWave merged with the Osaka Kintetsu Buffaloes during the off-season to form the Orix Buffaloes, and Yoshii ended up joining the Buffaloes for spring training and won six games in the 2005 season.

In 2006, Yoshii marked a win against the Tohoku Rakuten Golden Eagles, becoming the fifth player in to have recorded victories against 12 Japanese professional baseball teams. On April 1, 2007, he gave up two grand slams in one inning against the Rakuten Eagles, but the third baseman, Greg LaRocca, had committed an error before loading the bases, giving Yoshii the irregular record of 8 runs given up, but no earned runs. On April 25, 2007, the 42-year-old Yoshii started the game against the Rakuten Eagles with 18-year-old Masahiro Tanaka as the opposing pitcher and recorded a win giving up 1 run over 5 innings of pitching. This made him the sixth Japanese pitcher to have recorded a win at or above age 42, after Shinji Hamasaki, Tadashi Wakabayashi, Yoshinori Sato, Yutaka Ohno, and Kimiyasu Kudoh.

He continued to pitch during the season as a starter but was demoted to relief duty by manager Terry Collins after several poor performances. Yoshii requested to be traded to another team where he could continue to start and was sent to the Chiba Lotte Marines on June 28 in exchange for an outfielder. His pitching continued to decline, and he ended the season with a 1–9 record before being demoted to the minors. He was released by the Marines on November 13, and announced his retirement to become a pitching coach for the Hokkaido Nippon-Ham Fighters under manager Masataka Nashida.

In October 7, Chiba Lotte Marines announced Yoshii will be the manager of the Chiba Lotte Marines for the upcoming season.

See also
 List of Japanese baseball players
 List of Japanese players in Major League Baseball

References

External links

1965 births
Living people
Chiba Lotte Marines players
Chiba Lotte Marines managers
Colorado Rockies players
Japanese baseball coaches
Japanese expatriate baseball players in Canada
Japanese expatriate baseball players in the United States
Kintetsu Buffaloes players
Major League Baseball pitchers
Major League Baseball players from Japan
Montreal Expos players
New York Mets players
Nippon Professional Baseball coaches
Nippon Professional Baseball pitchers
Orix BlueWave players
Orix Buffaloes players
Baseball people from Wakayama Prefecture
Yakult Swallows players